Léopold Charles Norbert De Wael (14 July 1823 – 17 August 1892) was a Belgian merchant and liberal politician.

He was mayor of Antwerp, member of the provincial council of Antwerp and a Member of Parliament. His most important achievement was the straightening of the embankment of the Schelde. He tore down the North and South fortress (Noord- en het Zuidkasteel). While he was mayor of Antwerp, the Athenaeum was built, the Museum of Fine Arts, the Stuyvenberg hospital, the National Bank building in Antwerp, the Court of Justice and the theatre.

Sources
 Leopold De Wael (Liberal Archive)
 Leopold De Wael (GvA)

1823 births
1892 deaths

Mayors of Antwerp, Belgium